The 1598 Amasya–Çorum earthquake devastated central north Anatolia during the month of May. The earthquake destroyed the towns of Amasya and Çorum, killing at least 60,000 people. A tsunami accompanied the shock, drowning many people along the Black Sea coast of present-day Turkey. Several thousand people drowned when the tsunami advanced towards coastal towns and villages. The tsunami inundated up to one mile inland. The tsunami is thought to be the result of a submarine landslide. Little is known about the earthquake damage due to sparse historical records; the full extent of destruction is not known. It is thought to have been the result of rupture along the North Anatolian Fault but the specific segments which were involved could not be identified due to limited information. It is unlikely there was surface rupturing involved.

See also
 List of historical earthquakes
 List of earthquakes in Turkey

References 

Earthquakes in Turkey
History of Amasya Province
Tsunamis in Turkey
History of Çorum Province